Pfarrkirchen is a municipality in southern Lower Bavaria Germany, the capital of the district Rottal-Inn.

It may also refer to:
Pfarrkirchen bei Bad Hall, a municipality in the district of Steyr-Land in the Austrian state of Upper Austria
Pfarrkirchen im Mühlkreis,  municipality in the district of Rohrbach in the Austrian state of Upper Austria